Peter Stas (born 1963) is a Dutch entrepreneur and author. In 1988, after he completed his studies in Business Economics at the Erasmus University and worked as Product-Marketing Manager for Royal Philips Electronics, he founded, with his wife Aletta Stas-Bax, the watch company Frédérique Constant. The manufacture's initial strategy was to focus its energy on classical luxury watches at an affordable price. The Accessible Luxury positioning was the basis of strong growth during the financial crisis when consumers came back more to classical values and accessible prices.

Peter Stas played an outspoken role in a conflict with the Swatch Group after it announced a reduction in its provision of watch component parts to third parties. Stas said the proposed cuts would establish an unfair advantage and stifle competition, and not be good for the Swiss watch industry or consumer choice. A legal action to request a freeze before the Federal Administrative Court of Switzerland together with eight independent watch and movement companies to block the 2012 cuts was rejected. After a long standoff, Switzerland’s Competition Commission (COMCO) finally ruled that it would not allow the Swatch Group to reduce supplies of assortments (i.e. the regulating organ of a mechanical movement: escape wheel, pallet lever, balance wheel and balance spring) that it sells to Swiss watch brands outside the group.

In 2002, to diversify the Frédérique Constant group, Stas and his wife acquired Alpina Watches, a manufacturer of Swiss sports watches founded in 1883.

In 2009, Stas co-founded Ateliers deMonaco, a high-end watch manufacturer based in Monaco.

In 2013, in collaboration with Aletta Stas, Gisbert L. Brunner and Alexander Linz, Peter Stas wrote the book Live your passion, Building a watch manufacture.

In 2015, Stas played a substantial role in the introduction of the "Horological Smartwatch", a smartwatch design that uses a secondary analog dial rather than a screen for its display – giving the timepiece a more classic look than other such devices. The Horological Smartwatch product line included models for both the Frédérique Constant and Alpina watch brands, and used "MotionX" core technology licensed from the California-based company Fullpower Technologies. It was developed in a joint venture known as Manufacture Modules Technologies (MMT).

In 2016, Aletta and Peter Stas sold their watch brands to Citizen, creating a high-tech collaboration in development of electronic, mechanical and hybrid calibres combining Frederique Constant’s high-end Manufacture capability with Citizen’s long history in revolutionary solar, radio and ultra-thin calibre innovations.

In 2018, Peter Stas reveals the world's first mechanical smartwatch, the Frederique Constant Hybrid Manufacture that fuses smartwatch technology with a mechanical movement.

Peter Stas is currently CEO of Frédérique Constant.

Sources

Further reading

External links
 Interview: Peter Stas (CEO, Frederique Constant)
 Blog Peter Stas (CEO, Frederique Constant)

Dutch chief executives
Living people
1963 births
People from Gouda, South Holland
Citizen Watch